Vinayagar Sundar Vel  known professionally as Sundar C.,  is an Indian film director, actor and producer. He has directed over 34 films in Tamil and acted in 17 movies as the protagonist.

His notable films include Ullathai Allitha (1996), Arunachalam (1997), Unnai Thedi (1999), Anbe Sivam (2003), Winner (2003), Giri (2004), Kalakalappu (2012), Theeya Velai Seiyyanum Kumaru (2013), Aranmanai (2014), Aambala (2015) and Kalakalappu 2 (2018).

Sundar C is one of the few directors who directed Rajinikanth and Kamal Haasan (in Arunachalam (1997) and Anbe Sivam (2003), respectively.

He took a short break from direction, after his initial launch as an actor in 2006, with the film Thalai Nagaram, which became a commercial success. He returned to direction with his trade mark comedy roller coaster in the movie Kalakalappu in 2012 and it went on to become a success.

His successful career as a director continued with the 2014 Aranmanai film series.

He also produced the TV series Nandini (2017-2018), along with his wife ( the actress Khushbu) aired on Sun TV. He also produced movies like Hello Naan Pei Pesuren (2016), Meesaya Murukku (2017), Natpe Thunai (2019), Naan Sirithal (2020), Naanga Romba Busy (2020) and Pattampoochi (2022).

Career
Sundar C started his career as an assistant director to Manivannan and made his directorial debut with the movie Murai Maman (1995). Sundar revealed that he initially wanted a leading action hero to play the lead role in his film and approached Sarathkumar, but the producer was unable to sign the actor. Subsequently, the director chose Jayaram to play the lead role in the film and also said that he tapped into his innate sense of humour, as Jayaram was very famous for his humour in Malayalam. Murai Maman did well at the box office and Sundar went on to direct many humour themed films such as Ullathai Allitha (1996), Mettukudi (1996) and Unakkaga Ellam Unakkaga (1999) with Karthik. In 1997, he directed his highest-profile project till date, Arunachalam, with Rajinikanth. He has also occasionally directed action and thriller films such as Unnai Kann Theduthey (2000), Rishi (2001) and Chinna (2005). His favourite heroine was actress Rambha; as a Director he made her as his lead heroine in his 6 movies.

In the late 1990s, Sundar C had a brief career slump, where several of his films became stuck or did not have a theatrical release. Projects including collaborations with Karthik in Athai Magan featuring Ramya Krishnan, Kadhal Solla Vanthen featuring Isha Koppikar, and Vaazhkkai Vaazhvatharkke were affected. Likewise, a proposed projects titled Paarvai with Jayaram and Khushbu, was also shelved.

In 2003, he directed two films Anbe Sivam and Winner. Winner was successful and the comedy scenes from that film became hugely popular. However, Anbe Sivam, despite being critically acclaimed, under performed at the box office, but became a cult classic. Anbe Sivam remains his only humane realism movie till today out of his regular commercial cinema genre. After directing Rendu (2006), Sundar took a break from directing in order to concentrate on his acting career. He made his acting debut as lead actor with Thalai Nagaram (2006), which was well received. Then he went on to play lead roles with the commercially successful Veerappu (2007), directed by Badri and Sandai (2008) by Sakthi Chidambaram. He then made a comeback as a director with Nagaram Marupakkam (2010).

In 2012, written and directed Madha Gaja Raja but the film remains unreleased. Following Kalakalappu in 2012, he directed film like Theeya Velai Seiyyanum Kumaru (2013), Aranmanai (2014), Aranmanai 2 (2016) and Kalakalappu 2 (2018). He acted in lead role in the horror thriller, Iruttu (2019) directed by V. Z. Durai. The film was released to positive reviews. And directed Vishal's film, Action (2019). His next release as a director and actor is Aranmanai 3, produced by Avni Cinemax , with his own production house. The film received negative reviews from critics, but becomes a box-office success, and marked as Hat-trick hit of his Aranmanai series. And he also signed a new film as an lead actor in Thalai Nagaram 2 with V. Z. Durai. A sequel to the successful film Thalai Nagaram (2006). Sundar also officially confirmed that he is going to make his fourth installment in Aranmanai series on 2023, will begin as Aranmanai 4.

Filmography

As an actor

As a director and writer

As a  Singer

As a Producer

Films

Television

Serials

Shows

References

External links 

 

Living people
Tamil male actors
Film directors from Tamil Nadu
Tamil film directors
People from Erode district
1968 births
Recipients of the Kalaimamani Award
20th-century Indian film directors
21st-century Indian film directors
Tamil screenwriters
Screenwriters from Tamil Nadu
20th-century Indian male actors
21st-century Indian male actors
Male actors in Tamil cinema
20th-century Indian dramatists and playwrights
21st-century Indian dramatists and playwrights
Tamil television producers
Tamil television writers